Saints Andrew and Philip Cathedral, Mukono is an Anglican cathedral in Mukono District, in the Central Region of Uganda.The current Diocesan is The Rt. Rev. James Ssebaggala.

References

Anglican cathedrals in Uganda